John Macky (died 1726) was a Scottish spy. He was the first person to inform the British authorities of James II's intended invasion of England in 1692 after the former king had fled from France to England. In October 1693 he was made inspector of the coast from Harwich to Dover, tasked with intercepting hostile intelligence.

Macky published an attack on James II's exiled court in A View of the Court of St Germains from the Year 1690 to 1695 in 1696. His network of spies was crucial to the discovery in February and March 1708 of the Jacobite plans to invade Scotland. He later came under the suspicion of the authorities and was imprisoned, but was released in 1714 following the accession of George I.

Macky married Sarah Spring, the only daughter of Sir William Spring, 2nd Baronet, and used her dowry to fund the construction of five packet boats in Dover, where he served as Director of the Packet Boats. In 1733 their son, Spring Macky, published Memoirs of the Secret Services of John Macky.

Notes

Publications
 A Journey through Scotland (1723) Reprinted, with annotations and an Introduction by Anne M. McKim, by The Grimsay Press (2014) 
 Memoirs of the secret services of John Macky (1733)

1726 deaths
Scottish spies
Year of birth unknown
17th-century spies
18th-century spies